Alice Annum (born 20 October 1948 in Accra) is a retired Ghanaian sprinter. Her personal best time in the 200 metres was 22.89 seconds, achieved at the 1972 Olympic Games in Munich. She was the first woman to represent Ghana at the Olympics. Since then, Alice has participated in the 1964 Olympics held in Tokyo, 1968 in Mexico and the 1972 Olympics held in Munich.

Annum was one of many athletes through the defunct National Sports Festivals organised annually in Ghana. She benefited from the sponsorship of Ghanaian athletes by the United States and competed for the University of Tennessee. She competed in the 1964 Olympic Games but did not advance past the preliminary stages in the long jump, placing 28th with a best jump of 5.45 metres.

She was honoured in 2010 for her achievements in sports by the Action Progressive Institute in Ghana. In 1970, she won silver at the Commonwealth games in both 100 m and 200 m.

Personal life 
Alice has 3 children.

International competitions

References

External links
 
 
 

1948 births
Living people
Sportspeople from Accra
Ghanaian female sprinters
Ghanaian female long jumpers
Olympic athletes of Ghana
Athletes (track and field) at the 1964 Summer Olympics
Athletes (track and field) at the 1968 Summer Olympics
Athletes (track and field) at the 1972 Summer Olympics
Commonwealth Games bronze medallists for Ghana
Commonwealth Games silver medallists for Ghana
Commonwealth Games medallists in athletics
Athletes (track and field) at the 1966 British Empire and Commonwealth Games
Athletes (track and field) at the 1970 British Commonwealth Games
Athletes (track and field) at the 1974 British Commonwealth Games
African Games gold medalists for Ghana
African Games medalists in athletics (track and field)
Athletes (track and field) at the 1965 All-Africa Games
Athletes (track and field) at the 1973 All-Africa Games
USA Outdoor Track and Field Championships winners
USA Indoor Track and Field Championships winners
Accra Girls Senior High School alumni
20th-century Ghanaian women
21st-century Ghanaian women
Medallists at the 1970 British Commonwealth Games
Medallists at the 1974 British Commonwealth Games